The Supreme Macedonian Committee chetas' action in 1895 was an armed expedition of several chetas from Bulgaria into the Ottoman-ruled Macedonia and Thrace in the period of June-August 1895. Its aim was to provoke a general uprising in the area and to draw the attention of the Great Powers to non-compliance of the Treaty of Berlin (1878), and the provided reforms in European Turkey. The Supreme Macedonian Committee invited about 40 active and reserve officers from the Bulgarian army, as well as some old vojvodes from Macedonia. Among them were Boris Sarafov, Toma Davidov, Mihail Apostolov, Yordan Venedikov, etc. The number of the rebels was about 800 people, divided into four detachments. After invading Macedonia, the separate detachments headed to Strumica, Melnik and Dospat, respectively, but generally did not achieve much success. The failure of the action caused disagreements in the organization. The Ottoman government took advantage of the attack of the Pomaks populated Dospat and spread information about the atrocities in the European press. The Great Powers did not react as expected to the raising of the Macedonian question and instead of putting pressure on the Ottoman Empire, they put pressure on the Bulgarian government.

Footnotes

See also
Gorna Dzhumaya Uprising
Kresna-Razlog Uprising

Conflicts in 1895
Macedonia under the Ottoman Empire
Rebellions against the Ottoman Empire
Military history of Bulgaria
Salonica vilayet
19th-century rebellions
Bulgarian rebellions
1895 in the Ottoman Empire
1895 in Bulgaria
Macedonian Question